The Kansas–Oklahoma–Missouri League (or KOM League) was a name of an American minor league baseball league which was established in 1946 and played through 1952. As the name indicates, the Class D level league had franchises based in Kansas, Missouri and Oklahoma. Baseball Hall of Fame members Mickey Mantle played in the league for the 1949 Independence Yankees and Burleigh Grimes managed the 1948 Independence Yankees.

History
The Kansas–Oklahoma–Missouri League was founded after World War II and ran from 1946 through 1952 as a Class D level league. Like many post-war minor leagues, it did not last a complete decade of play. During the seven year run of the league there were nine cities that represented the league. Four were from Kansas, four from Oklahoma and one from Missouri.

E.L. Dale served as the League president for its entire seven years of operation. The Ponca City Dodgers won three of the seven league titles, winning championships in 1948, 1950 and 1951. No other team won more than one championship. The total attendance of the KOM league, in the seven year period, reached slightly over two million fans. In 1948 the league had its best year, drawing 387,980, before the league permanently folded after the 1952 season. The Kansas–Oklahoma–Missouri League League had 1,588 total players, 30 made it to the majors and one made it to the Hall of Fame. In his first professional season, Mickey Mantle played for the 1949 Independence Yankees, hitting .313 with 7 HR, 63 RBI. Just graduated from high school in Oklahoma, Mantle received a $1,100 signing bonus from the New York Yankees and a salary of $400 for the rest of the season.

Cities represented
Bartlesville, OK: Bartlesville Oilers (1946–1947); Bartlesville Pirates (1948–1952)
Blackwell, OK: Blackwell Broncos (1952)
Carthage, MO: Carthage Cardinals (1946–1948); Carthage Cubs (1949–1951)
Chanute, KS: Chanute Athletics (1946–1947, 1949–1950); Chanute Giants (1948) 
Independence, KS: Independence Yankees (1947–1950); Independence Browns 1952
Iola, KS: Iola Cubs (1946-1947); Iola Indians (1948–1952)
Miami, OK: Miami Blues (1946); Miami Owls (1947-1949); Miami Eagles (1950–1952)
Pittsburg, KS:Pittsburg Browns (1946–1951); Pittsburg Pirates (1952)
Ponca City, OK: Ponca City Dodgers (1947–1952)

Standings & statistics

1946 to 1947 
1946 Kansas-Oklahoma-Missouri League - schedule
The League and all of its member teams were created. Teams were formed in Bartlesville, Oklahoma, Carthage, Missouri, Chanute, Kansas, Iola, Kansas, Miami, Oklahoma, and Pittsburg, Kansas.

 Playoffs: Iola 3 games, Miami 2; Chanute 3 games, Pittsburg 2. Finals: Iola 3 games, Chanute 3. Rest of playoffs called off due to rain and lack of available playing grounds. 

 Brooklyn assigned a few players to Miami that season but the team was actually run by Ted Vernon of Amarillo, Texas.  When it was discovered that the Miami Baseball Club Inc. had turned the reigns of the operation of the club to Mr. Vernon, W. G.  Bramham, the President of the National Association of Professional Baseball Leagues, sent a very stern letter to the Miami baseball officials that the rules had been violated in this matter. The next year the Dodgers moved their franchise to Ponca City, Oklahoma and Mr. Vernon returned to Amarillo.

Chanute beat Pittsburg by 3 games to 2 in the first round of the playoffs. Iola beat Miami by the same number. The championship series between Chanute and Iola ended tied at three games apiece, although Chanute won 4 games. A dispute arose between the Chanute and Iola club officials regarding Chanute selecting Dave Dennis from the Miami club for the playoffs. Although Iola owner Earl Sifers originally agreed to the arrangement he later changed his mind. By the time the dispute was settled it was too late in the fall, young men had to go back to school, the rodeo took over the ball park playing area and then the rains came.

1947 Kansas-Oklahoma-Missouri League
Teams from Independence, Kansas and Ponca City, Oklahoma joined. 
 Playoffs: Miami 3 games, Bartlesville 1; Iola 3 games, Pittsburg 1. Finals: Miami 4 games, Iola 1.

1948 to 1949 
1948 Kansas-Oklahoma-Missouri League
 Playoffs: Pittsburg 3 games, Ponca City 2; Independence 3 games, Bartlesville 2. Finals: Independence 4 games, Pittsburg 1. 

1949 Kansas-Oklahoma-Missouri League  schedule
 Playoffs: Independence 3 games, Ponca City 1; Iola 3 games, Bartlesville 1. Finals: Independence 3 games, Iola 0.

1950 to 1952 
1950 Kansas-Oklahoma-Missouri League
 Playoffs: Ponca City 3 games, Pittsburg 2; Bartlesville 3 games, Carthage 1. Finals: Ponca City 3 games, Bartlesville 1. 

1951 Kansas-Oklahoma-Missouri League
The teams in Chanute and Independence folded.

 Playoffs: Carthage 3 games, Ponca City 2; Miami 3 games, Bartletsville 1. Finals: Carthage 3 games, Miami 0. 

1952 Kansas-Oklahoma-Missouri League
The Carthage Cubs moved to Blackwell, Oklahoma. The Pittsburg Brownies moved to Independence, Kansas. The Bartlesville Pirates moved to the now-vacant Pittsburg on July 7.
 Bartlesville moved to Pittsburg July 7. Playoffs: Ponca City 1 game, Iola 0; Miami 1 game, Pittsburg 0;  Finals: Miami 2 games, Ponca City 0.

References

External links
Sumner, Benjamin Barrett. Minor League Baseball Standings:All North American Leagues, Through 1999. Jefferson, N.C.:McFarland. 
Hall, John G. "Majoring in the Minors--a glimpse of baseball in a small town. 1996 Oklahoma Bylines. . Reprinted 2000 by Inter-State Printing. Sedalia, Missouri.
Hall, John G. "The KOM League Remembered." Arcadia Publishing. Charleston SC, Chicago IL, Portsmouth NH, San Francisco. .
Hall, John G. "Mickey Mantle Before the Glory." Leathers Publishing, Leawood, Kansas 2006. .

External links
 Baseball Reference

Sports leagues established in 1946
Defunct minor baseball leagues in the United States
Baseball leagues in Missouri
Baseball in Oklahoma
Baseball leagues in Kansas
Sports leagues disestablished in 1952
Baseball leagues in Oklahoma